Appetite is the desire for nourishment.

Appetite may also refer to:

Arts, entertainment, and media

Music
 Appetite (album), an album by Kris Delmhorst
 "Appetite" (Katharine McPhee song), from Hysteria, 2015
 "Appetite", a 1985 song by Prefab Sprout from the album Steve McQueen 
 "Appetite", a 2008 song by Usher from the album Here I Stand

Other uses in arts, entertainment, and media
 Appetite (art gallery), a former Argentinian art gallery
 Appetite (journal), a journal of behavioral sciences and food intake
 Appetite Production, a Polish film production company

Other uses
 Specific appetite, a drive to eat foods with specific flavors or other characteristics
 Appetites of the soul, a concept in Thomist philosophy; see Thomism § Soul

See also
 Apatite, a group of phosphate minerals
 Appetition, the philosophical concept of desire
 Appetizer
 Bon Appétit (disambiguation)